Holdsworth Glacier is a tributary glacier about  long, flowing northeast from Fuller Dome to enter the southeast side of Bartlett Glacier, in the Queen Maud Mountains of Antarctica. It was named by the Advisory Committee on Antarctic Names for Gerald Holdsworth, who was involved in geological studies at McMurdo Station in the summer of 1965–66.

References

Glaciers of Amundsen Coast